Bret Young (born February 29, 1960 in The Bronx) is an American sprint canoeist who competed in the mid-1980s. At the 1984 Summer Olympics in Los Angeles, he finished ninth in the Men's C-2 500 metre finals event with his partner Bruce Merritt.

References
Sports-Reference.com profile

External links
 

1960 births
American male canoeists
Canoeists at the 1984 Summer Olympics
Living people
Olympic canoeists of the United States
Sportspeople from the Bronx
20th-century American people